Hubbardton is a town in Rutland County, Vermont, United States. The town was named for Thomas Hubbard, a landholder. The population was 735 at the 2020 census.

The town was the site of the Battle of Hubbardton, where British forces attacked Americans during the Saratoga Campaign of 1777.

Geography
Lake Hortonia and Beebe Pond are two of the larger bodies of water in the town.

Demographics

At the 2000 census there were 752 people, 296 households, and 203 families in the town.  The population density was 27.3 people per square mile (10.6/km2).  There were 580 housing units at an average density of 21.1 per square mile (8.1/km2).  The racial makeup of the town was 95.61% White, 1.33% African American, 0.40% Native American, 0.40% Asian, 0.13% Pacific Islander, 0.93% from other races, and 1.20% from two or more races. Hispanic or Latino of any race were 1.60%.

Of the 296 households 29.4% had children under the age of 18 living with them, 57.1% were married couples living together, 5.7% had a female householder with no husband present, and 31.1% were non-families. 21.3% of households were one person and 6.8% were one person aged 65 or older.  The average household size was 2.54 and the average family size was 2.96.

The age distribution was 22.7% under the age of 18, 7.6% from 18 to 24, 27.4% from 25 to 44, 31.8% from 45 to 64, and 10.5% 65 or older.  The median age was 40 years. For every 100 females, there were 106.6 males.  For every 100 females age 18 and over, there were 106.8 males.

The median household income was $37,647 and the median family income  was $39,485. Males had a median income of $30,982 versus $19,583 for females. The per capita income for the town was $19,276.  About 6.3% of families and 13.0% of the population were below the poverty line, including 16.7% of those under age 18 and 2.4% of those age 65 or over.

Residents
Horace Holmes Thomas, lawyer, Union Army officer, state legislator and House Speaker in Illinois, and appraiser

References

External links
 Hubbardton Battlefield State Historic Site

 
Towns in Vermont
Towns in Rutland County, Vermont